Aerenomera spilas is a species of beetle in the family Cerambycidae. It was described by Martins in 1984.

References

Aerenicini
Beetles described in 1984